Yoy or YOY may refer to:

 Yoy people, an ethnic group in Southeast Asia
 Yoy language, a Tai language of Thailand and Laos
 Yoy Simulators, a chilean tech company

See also
 Year-on-Year Inflation-Indexed Swap

Language and nationality disambiguation pages